Atraf-i-Baldah or just Atraf Baldah district was the capital of Hyderabad state. It consisted of seven talukas during the reign of the Nizams, rulers of Hyderabad State. The total revenue from the area went to the private purse of the Nizam known as Sarf-e-Khas.

Atraf-i-Baldah meaning Suburbs of the City. The area was distinct and was in direct control of the Nizams, outside this area was ruled by Jamindars, Jagirdars, landlords etc.

Post Operation Polo
After the annexation of Hyderabad state with Operation Polo on September 1948, some land was taken by the Army and the rest to the state provincial government.

Division in Atraf-i-Balda district
Hyderabad State was made up of sixteen districts. The districts were grouped into four divisions and Atraf-i-Baldah was part of Medak Gulshanabad Division – districts included Atraf-i-Balda (Hyderabad), Mahbubnagar, Medak, Nalgonda (Nalgundah), and Nizamabad districts.

Atraf-i-Baldah Army
The area was under Nizam's private army, Atraf-i-Baldah Army.

Nizams Guaranteed State Railway
The District was well favoured as regards railways. The Nizam's State Railway crosses it from east to west, with six stations, and the Hyderabad-Godavari Valley line starting from Hyderabad has one station within its limits. The total length of railways is about 99 miles.

References

Hyderabad State